Newsweek Pakistan is published by AG Publications, a company wholly owned by Associated Group (AG), under license from Newsweek LLC. The licensing agreement with AG Publications follows similar publishing alliances for Newsweek editions. Newsweek's Asia Pacific edition, published in Hong Kong, has been available in Pakistan for over 50 years. Newsweek Pakistan replaced the Asia Pacific edition, and carries reportage, analysis and opinion on Pakistan in addition to the content featured in the international edition. The Pakistan edition draws upon both its own editorial staff and Newsweek's international network of correspondents.

Fasih Ahmed, who has reported for the Wall Street Journal, Newsweek and The Daily Beast, is the editor of Newsweek Pakistan. Ahmed won a New York Press Club award in 2008 for Newsweek’s coverage of the assassination of former Pakistani prime minister Benazir Bhutto.

History
AG launched its first media enterprise, Newsweek Pakistan, in August 2010. The cover of Newsweek Pakistan's first issue, captioned “The World’s Bravest Nation: Pakistan,” showed a boy displaced by the 2010 summer floods in Pakistan, the worst natural disaster in the history of the country. The magazine donated net proceeds from the sale of this debut issue to the U.N.’s World Food Program.

The debut issue also featured an exclusive interview with Pakistani nuclear scientist Abdul Qadeer Khan, and also included an article on Pakistan by Ron Moreau, author of the October 2007 Newsweek cover story, "The Most Dangerous Nation in the World is not Iraq. It's Pakistan."

The magazine is produced by AG Publications under license from Newsweek LLC, and is edited by Fasih Ahmed who has written for The Wall Street Journal, Newsweek International, and who was the inaugural Daniel Pearl fellow. The debut issue featured Ahmed's cover essay, “The World’s Bravest Nation,” which was also published online by Newsweek.

Some of the most important voices in Pakistan, and abroad, have written for Newsweek Pakistan. Among them: former Pakistani president Pervez Musharraf, lawyer and author Aitzaz Ahsan, Sherry Rehman, nuclear scientist A. Q. Khan, and former New Zealand prime minister Helen Clark.

The newsmagazine's coverage of the attack on schoolgirl activist Malala Yousafzai reported by Shehrbano Taseer was the cover story for the Pakistan edition as well as Newsweek‘s foreign editions.

In order to retain editorial independence, Newsweek Pakistan does not accept government advertising and takes special care to highlight for its readers any actual or perceived conflicts of interest between its news coverage and its corporate interests. Newsweek Pakistan operates on the principle of fear- and favor-free journalism.

On Facebook and Twitter, Newsweek Pakistan provides real-time updates and alerts to over quarter million of its social media subscribers.

The newsmagazine has hosted and sponsored events and seminars. On 2 April 2010, in Lahore, Newsweek Pakistan hosted an exclusive breakfast for Abdullah Gül, the then-President of the Republic of Turkey.

The newsmagazine's advisory board comprises Hameed Haroon, publisher of Dawn newspaper, Qazi Shaukat Fareed, who has worked with the U.N. for over 20 years; Parvez Hassan, lawyer and environmentalist; Ayesha Jalal, professor of history at Tufts University; and David Walters, former governor of Oklahoma.

International Operations

In 2013, Newsweek Pakistan ran two licensed international print editions after Newsweek in the U.S. went digital. The Europe, Middle East and Africa (EMEA) and the Latin American editions, both in English, were produced in Pakistan and printed out of Germany and Brazil. The EMEA edition was distributed in 55 countries and the Lat Am edition was available in another 28 countries. Ahmed was the editor of these editions as well.

Awards
Newsweek Pakistan's cover story on the challenges facing the country's polio vaccination campaign won a gold medal at the 2013 United Nations Correspondents Association (UNCA) awards. Benazir Shah was the principal reporter of the piece.

References

External links
Newsweek
Associated Group (AG)
History and demographics of Newsweek
"Newsweek Pakistan Launches". The Huffington Post. 31 August 2010.

2010 establishments in Pakistan
English-language magazines
Magazines established in 2010
Mass media in Lahore
Pakistan
News magazines published in Pakistan
Weekly magazines published in Pakistan